Ferromanganese is a ferroalloy with high manganese content (high-carbon ferromanganese can contain as much as 80% Mn by weight). It is made by heating a mixture of the oxides MnO2 and Fe2O3, with carbon (usually as coal and coke) in either a blast furnace or an electric arc furnace-type system, called a submerged arc furnace. The oxides undergo carbothermal reduction in the furnaces, producing the ferromanganese. Ferromanganese is used as a deoxidizer for steel.

A North American standard specification is ASTM A99.  The ten grades covered under this specification includes;
Standard ferromanganese
Medium-carbon ferromanganese
Low-carbon ferromanganese

A similar material is a pig iron with high content of manganese, is called spiegeleisen, or specular pig iron.

History

In 1856, Robert Forester Mushet "used manganese to improve the ability of steel produced by the Bessemer process to withstand rolling and forging at elevated temperatures."

In 1860, Henry Bessemer invented the use of ferromanganese as a method of introducing manganese in controlled proportions during the production of steel. The advantage of combining powdered iron oxide and manganese oxide together is the lower melting point of the combined alloy compared to pure manganese oxide.

In 1872, Lambert von Pantz produced ferromanganese in a blast furnace, with significantly higher manganese content than was previously possible (37% instead of the previous 12%). This won his company international recognition, including a gold medal at the 1873 World Exposition in Vienna and a certificate of award at the 1876 Centennial Exposition in Pennsylvania.

In an 1876 article, MF Gautier explained that the magnetic oxide needs to be slagged off by the addition of manganese (then in the form of spiegel iron) in order to befit it for rolling.

Gallery

Standard Ferromanganese 
Standard ferromanganese, also known as high-carbon ferromanganese, is one of the manganese ferroalloys smelted directly from manganese ores. Manganese content ranges from 74 to 82% and the carbon content from 7 to 7.5%. It is produced either by a blast furnace or a submerged arc furnace. The alloy is smelted either by high-manganese slag or discard slag practices. High-manganese slag practice operates with slag containing 30–42%Mn. Because of its high manganese value, the slag is recycled as feed for the production of manganese metal by electrolytic process or for the production of silicomanganese alloy. Addition of lime is avoided to keep the manganese content high. The discard slag practice operates with slag containing 10–20%Mn. This level of content is too low to extract further manganese value economically. Lime is used to keep the manganese content low in slag.

Applications

See also 

 Mangalloy
 Ferromanganese Nodules

References

Further reading

Ferroalloys
Deoxidizers
Manganese